Afropsipyla similis is a species of snout moth in the genus Afropsipyla. It was described by Boris Balinsky in 1994 and is known from South Africa (it was described from Johannesburg).

References

Endemic moths of South Africa
Moths described in 1994
Phycitinae
Moths of Africa